Iunit was a minor goddess in ancient Egyptian religion, whose name means "She of Armant". She is the consort of Montu.

References

Egyptian goddesses

ca:Llista de personatges de la mitologia egípcia#J